The Baptist World Alliance (BWA) is the largest international Baptist organization with an estimated 51 million people in 2022 with 246 member bodies in 128 countries and territories. A voluntary association of Baptist churches, the BWA accounts for about half the Baptists in the world. It is the 8th largest Christian communion.

The BWA was founded in 1905 in London during an international congress of Baptist churches. Its headquarters are in Falls Church, Virginia, United States. It is led by General Secretary and CEO Elijah M. Brown and by President Tomás Mackey.

History

The roots of the Baptist World Alliance can be traced back to the seventeenth century when Baptist leader Thomas Grantham proposed the concept of a congregation of all Christians in the world that are "baptised according to the appointment of Christ." Similar proposals were put forward later such as the call of John Rippon in 1790 for a world meeting of Baptists "to consult the ecclesiastical good to the whole."

It was, however, only in 1904 when such congregation became a reality. John Newton Prestridge, editor of The Baptist Argus, at Louisville, Kentucky called for a world gathering of Baptists. John Howard Shakespeare, editor of The Baptist Times and Freeman, London, endorsed the proposal. In October 1904, the Baptist Union of Great Britain passed a resolution to invite a Congress to meet with them in 1905.At the Congress, a committee was formed, which proposed a Constitution for a World Alliance. The Baptist World Alliance was founded in London, during this first Baptist World Congress in July 1905.

The gathering was referred to as an "alliance" and not a council in order to establish the nature of the dialogue as a meeting. This means that the body wields no authority over participating churches or national Baptist unions, serving only as a forum for collaboration.

In 2020, the Argentine Pastor Tomás Mackey succeeded South African Pastor Paul Msiza.

Statistics
According to a denomination census released in 2022, the BWA has 246  participating Baptist denominations or fellowships in 128 countries, with 176,000 churches and 51,000,000 baptized members. These statistics are not fully representative, however, since some churches in the United States have dual or triple national Baptist affiliation, causing a church and its members to be counted by more than one Baptist denomination.

Beliefs 
The Alliance has a Baptist confession of faith.

Organisational structure
The Alliance is divided into six regional or geographical fellowships: North American Baptist Fellowship, Asia Pacific Baptist Federation (formerly Asian Baptist Federation), All-Africa Baptist Fellowship, Caribbean Baptist Fellowship, Latin American Baptist Union, and European Baptist Federation. Each regional fellowship is served by an Executive Secretary.

List of presidents

Baptist World Congress
Baptist World Congresses have been held every few years since 1905.

Social programs 
The denomination has an affiliated humanitarian organization, BWAid.

Ecumenical relations
The Baptist World Alliance is involved in ecumenical dialogues, including with the Roman Catholic Church and the World Methodist Council.  One series of International Conversations between the BWA and the Catholic Church took place from between 1984 and 1988 moderated by the Reverend Dr David T. Shannon, sometime President of Andover Newton Theological School, and the Most Reverend Bede Heather, Bishop of Parramatta. While this dialogue produced the report called Summons to Witness to Christ in Today's World, the second phase did not push through because of opposition from within the Baptist World Alliance itself. Negotiations continued, however, so that a series of consultations transpired from 2000 to 2003. During this period the Baptists and Catholics discussed important doctrines that divide these denominations. These second series of conversations resulted in formal meetings between 2006 and 2010. The current Co-Moderators are Paul Fiddes, Professor of Systematic Theology in the University of Oxford and formerly Principal of Regent's Park College, Oxford, and Arthur J. Serratelli, Bishop of Paterson.

Controversies 
In 2004, the Southern Baptist Convention of the United States left the BWA after it had accused then-BWA President Kim of adopting a liberal theology because of his support for the exercise of pastoral ministry of women, its alleged anti-Americanism, and because member denominations including the American Baptist Churches USA and the Progressive National Baptist Convention allow the autonomy of its churches to perform same sex marriages. Alliance Secretary General Denton Lotz replied that the Alliance was not liberal, but evangelical conservative, that the American Baptist Churches USA in its constitution believed only in marriage between a man and a woman and that any accusations of anti-Americanism had resulted from his visits to Fidel Castro in Cuba for the import of Bibles and the expansion of the freedom of belief. The SBC also claimed the Alliance refused to discuss abortion stances. In a General Council Resolution, the Alliance lamented the widespread resort to abortion but acknowledges the diversity of views and calls on Baptists to honor each individuals freedom of conscience. In 2005, two state denomination members of the Southern Baptist Convention, the Baptist General Association of Virginia and the Baptist General Convention of Texas, applied for membership in the Alliance and were admitted.

See also
 List of Baptist confessions
 List of Baptist World Alliance National Fellowships
 World Evangelical Alliance
 Believers' Church

References

External links 
 

Christian organizations established in 1905
Baptist denominations
Baptist denominations established in the 20th century
1905 establishments in England
Falls Church, Virginia
International Christian organizations